Don Cox is an American educator and politician from Washington. Cox is a former Republican member of Washington House of Representatives from District 9.

Career 
From 1963 to 1990, Cox is a former 
teacher, counselor and administrator with Washington Public Schools. In 1990, Cox became a Superintendent with Colfax School District, until 1998.

Following the death of Rep. Steven Hailey, on January 19, 2009, Cox was appointed as a member of Washington House of Representatives for District 9.

Personal life 
Cox's wife is Sherry Cox. They have two children. Cox and her family live in Colfax, Washington.

References

External links 
 Don Cox at ballotpedia.org

Living people
Republican Party members of the Washington House of Representatives
1940 births